The Reddi kingdom or Kondavidu Reddi kingdom (1325–1448 CE) was established in  southern India by Prolaya Vema Reddi. Most of the region that was ruled by the Reddi dynasty is now part of modern-day coastal and central Andhra Pradesh.

Etymology
The Telugu term "Reddi", whose earlier forms were "Raddi", "Rattodi", and "Rattakudi", linked to the Sanskrit term "Rashtrakuta", was used for village headmen, who were responsible for organising the cultivation of the agricultural lands of the villages and collecting taxes. From the seventh century, some of the members of the Rattakudi families had important posts in the administration of the kingdoms. A copperplate record mentioned the grandfather of the founder of the dynasty as a sainya-nayaka, a commander of the forces.

Origin
The fall of the Kakatiya Kingdom in 1323, after being subject to seizes by the Tughlaq dynasty, led to a political vacuum in the Andhras.The Islamic conquerors failed to keep the region under effective control and constant infighting among themselves coupled with the martial abilities of the local Telugu warriors led to the loss of the entire region by 1347.

Whilst, this led to the rise of the Musunuris (initially were based in Coastal Andhra) and Recharlas in the Telangana region, the coastal belt saw the rise of a third warrior lineage—the Reddis of the Panta clan.

Established in about 1325 by Prolaya Vema Reddi,(also known as Komati Vema), his territory extended along the coast to Nellore in the south and Srisailam, in the west. He was succeeded by Anavota Reddi who consolidated the kingdom extensively and established its capital at Kondavidu in Guntur District.

By 1395, a second Reddi kingdom was established by a branch of the same lineage, with its capital in Rajahmundry, East Godavari District.

None of the Reddi lineages find any mention in Kakatiya era sources and cannot be exactly traced as to their origins. But, their inscriptions and humble genealogies suggest that they were born out of the late Kakatiya 'military milieu' and had a continuity with the local Telugu warrior culture.

Extent of rule

The Reddi kings ruled coastal and central Andhra for over a hundred years from 1325 to 1448. At its maximum extent, the Reddi kingdom stretched from Cuttack, Orissa to the north, Kanchi to the south and Srisailam to the west. The initial capital of the kingdom was Addanki. Later, it was moved to Kondavidu and a subsidiary branch was established at  Rajahmundry. The Reddis were known for their fortifications. Two major hill forts, one at Kondapalli, 20 km north west of Vijayawada and another at Kondavidu about 30 km west of Guntur stand testimony to the fort building skill of the Reddi kings. The forts of Bellamkonda, Vinukonda and Nagarjunakonda in the Palnadu region were also part of the Reddi kingdom. The dynasty remained in power till the middle of the 15th century. In 1424, Kondavidu was annexed to the Vijayanagara Empire and Rajahmundry was conquered by the Gajapatis some twenty five years after.  The Gajapatis eventually lost control of coastal Andhra after the defeat of Gajapati Prataprudra Deva by Krishna Deva Raya of Vijayanagara. The territories of the Reddi kingdom thus came under the control of the Vijayanagara Empire.

Religion

The Reddi rulers played a prominent part in post-Kakatiyas of Telangana. The Kakatiya empire came to an end in 1323 after the army of the Delhi sultanate invaded Warangal and captured Kakatiya ruler Pratapa Rudra. Warangal fell to the invaders and Ulugh Khan commanded Warangal and Telangana. During this time of foreign invasion and chaos in Telugu country, seeds of revolt were sown by two princes, Annaya Mantri and Kolani Rudradeva.

It was during this chaotic period in Andhra history that Prolaya Vema Reddi established the Reddi kingdom in 1325. The Reddi rulers patronised and protected Hinduism and its institutions. The Brahmins were given liberal grants by the Reddi kings and the agraharas of Brahmins were restored. Vedic studies were encouraged. The Hindu temples of Srisailam and Ahobilam were provided with more facilities. Prolaya Vema Reddi bestowed a number of agraharas on the Brahmins. He was revered by the title of Apratima-Bhudana-Parasurama. He commissioned major repairs to the Srisailam Mallikarjuna Swami temple, and had a flight of steps built from the Krishna River to the temple. The Narasimha Swamy temple at Ahobilam was built during his reign. He built 108 temples for Shiva.

Literature

Telugu literature blossomed under the Reddi kings. The Reddi kings also patronized Sanskrit. Several of the Reddi kings themselves were distinguished scholars and authors. Kumaragiri Reddi, Kataya Vema Reddi and Pedakomati Vema Reddi were the most outstanding among them. Errapragada (Errana), Srinatha and Potana were the remarkable poets of this period. Errapragada, the last of the Kavitraya (Trinity of Poets) was the court poet of Prolaya Vema Reddi. He completed the Telugu translation of the Mahabharata. He completed the rendition of the Aranya Parva of Mahabharata left incomplete by Nannaya Bhattu (Aadi Kavi who started the translation of Mahabharata into Telugu). He wrote Hari Vamsa and Narasimha Purana. Errana's translation of the Ramayana in Chapu form (a style of poetry) has been lost.

Administration

The administration was carried according to the "Dharmasutras". One-sixth of agriculture surplus was levied as tax. Under the reign of Anavota Reddi custom duties and taxes on trade were lifted. As a result, trade flourished. Sea trade was carried through the port Motupalli. A large number of merchants settled down near it. Celebrating 'Vasantotsavalu' was revived during the rule of Anavema Reddi. The Brahmins were given liberal grants by the Reddi kings. Caste system was observed. Heavy taxes by Racha Vema Reddi made him highly unpopular.

See also 
 Gadwal Samsthanam
 Wanaparthy Samsthanam
 Papannapet Samsthanam
 History of Andhra Pradesh
 List of Reddy dynasties
 List of Nayaka dynasties

Notes and references

Book sources

 
 
 
 
 
 
 

States and territories established in 1325
States and territories disestablished in 1448
Telugu society
Empires and kingdoms of India
Dynasties of India
14th century in India
15th century in India